Wing Commander Eric James Brindley Nicolson,  (29 April 1917 – 2 May 1945) was a fighter pilot in the Royal Air Force and a recipient of the Victoria Cross, the highest award for gallantry in the face of the enemy that can be awarded to British and Commonwealth forces.

Early life
Eric James Brindley Nicolson was born in Hampstead, London, on 29 April 1917, and was educated at Yardley Court and Tonbridge School. In 1935 Nicolson began work as an engineer at Ricardo Engines. In 1936 he joined the Royal Air Force, with the service number 39329. After his training he joined No. 72 Squadron in 1937 and later moved to No. 249 Squadron in 1940.

Second World War
Nicolson was 23 years old and a flight lieutenant in No. 249 Squadron during the Second World War when he was awarded the Victoria Cross. On 16 August 1940 having taken off from RAF Boscombe Down near Salisbury, Nicolson's Hawker Hurricane was almost certainly fired on by the Messerschmitt Bf 109 of Heinz Bretnutz of II./JG 53, who returned to base with claims for two Hurricanes following this action.
Nicolson's engine was damaged and the petrol tank set alight. As he struggled to leave the blazing machine he saw another Messerschmitt, and managing to get back into the bucket seat, pressed the firing button and continued firing until the enemy plane dived away to destruction. Not until then did he bail out, and he was able to open his parachute in time to land safely in a field. On his descent, he was fired on by members of the Home Guard, who ignored his cry of being a RAF pilot.

Victoria Cross citation
The announcement and accompanying citation for the decoration was published in supplement to the London Gazette on 15 November 1940, reading

Fully recovered by September 1941, Nicolson was posted to India in 1942. Between August 1943 and August 1944 he was a squadron leader and commanding officer of No. 27 Squadron, flying Bristol Beaufighters over Burma. During this time he was awarded the Distinguished Flying Cross.

As a wing commander, Nicolson was killed on 2 May 1945 when a RAF B-24 Liberator from No. 355 Squadron, in which he was flying as an observer, caught fire and crashed into the Bay of Bengal. His body was not recovered. He is commemorated on the Singapore Memorial.

Nicolson was the only Battle of Britain pilot and the only pilot of RAF Fighter Command to be awarded the Victoria Cross during the Second World War. His Victoria Cross is displayed at the Royal Air Force Museum, Hendon, England.

Commemoration

In 2015, the RAF repainted a modern Eurofighter Typhoon jet, ZK349, in Second World War colours, and applied Nicolson's squadron number, GN-A, to commemorate the 75th anniversary of the Battle of Britain.

References

Further reading
 Mason, Peter D. Nicolson VC': the Full and Authorised Biography of James Brindley Nicolson, the only Pilot of Fighter Command in World War II to be awarded the Victoria Cross. Ashford, UK: Geerings, 1991. .

External links

James Brindley Nicolson
Fl. Lieutenant James Nicolson
 .

1917 births
1945 deaths
People from Hampstead
Royal Air Force wing commanders
Royal Air Force pilots of World War II
Royal Air Force recipients of the Victoria Cross
Royal Air Force personnel killed in World War II
Recipients of the Distinguished Flying Cross (United Kingdom)
Aviators killed in aviation accidents or incidents
The Few
British World War II recipients of the Victoria Cross
People educated at Tonbridge School
Military personnel from London